Hugh Hamilton Wilson Jr. (August 21, 1943 – January 14, 2018) was an American film director, writer and television showrunner. He is best known as the creator of the TV series WKRP in Cincinnati and Frank's Place, and as the director of the film comedies Police Academy and The First Wives Club.

Background
Wilson was born in Miami, Florida. He attended Coral Way Elementary, Ponce de Leon Jr. High, and Coral Gables Sr. High, where he was a member of the Ching Tang Fraternity. He entered the University of Florida in 1961 and graduated in 1964 with a degree in journalism. At Florida, he was a member of the Blue Key Honor Society and president of his fraternity, Phi Delta Theta. Wilson received the school's Distinguished Alumnus award in 1982. He has also served as a guest professor of media studies at the University of Virginia.

Career
In 1966, he entered the advertising business in Atlanta at the Burton-Campbell Agency.  He was a copywriter before becoming creative director in 1970 and president in 1973. Tom Patchett and Jay Tarses, producers of the Bob Newhart Show, were instrumental in getting Wilson a position with MTM Enterprises in 1975. They, along with Grant Tinker, gave him his first writing assignment for the Bob Newhart Show in early 1976 and in 1977 made him a co-producer of the Tony Randall Show. In 1978, Wilson created WKRP in Cincinnati (1978–1982) for CBS. Two of his WKRP scripts won Humanitas Prizes and the show was nominated twice for the Emmy in the Best Comedy category. The character of Bailey Quarters on WKRP was based on Wilson's wife.

Wilson attempted to break into movies by re-writing a low-budget comedy on the condition that he could direct it. The result was the first Police Academy for the Ladd Company (Warners) and producer Paul Maslansky. It was a surprise hit of 1984. In 1985, Wilson shot the singing cowboy comedy Rustlers' Rhapsody, starring Tom Berenger and Sela Ward. The movie was filmed in Spain. "I grew up watching Roy and Gene and Hopalong Cassidy," Wilson said in the production notes. "That was my idea of a movie." The movie failed at the box office but has gained a strong cult following over the years. The same year, he created the short-lived television series Easy Street starring Loni Anderson.

In 1988, Wilson returned to CBS to create and co-produce with Tim Reid the highly regarded but short-lived (22 episodes) Frank's Place. Along with The Days and Nights of Molly Dodd (created by Jay Tarses) the two shows were the first to be done in the style that has come to be known as "dramedy." Wilson received three Emmy nominations for Frank's Place and won the Emmy for Best Writing. Wilson also created the CBS show The Famous Teddy Z (1989) and directed the movies Guarding Tess (1994)  and Blast from the Past (1999).

His biggest film hit after Police Academy came in 1996 with The First Wives Club. The film became a surprise box-office success following its North American release, eventually grossing $181,490,000 worldwide, mostly from its domestic run, despite receiving mixed reviews, and developed a cult following particularly among middle-aged women. For its stars, including Bette Midler, Goldie Hawn and Diane Keaton, the actresses' highest-grossing project of the decade helped revitalize their careers in film and television.

In 2001, Wilson and John Grisham teamed up to make Mickey, an independent movie about little league baseball.

Personal life
Wilson married Charters Smith in 1979, with whom he had five children. Daughter Caroline Charters Wilson is an actress and singer. Wilson moved to Virginia in 1992 and sometimes taught screenwriting at the University of Virginia. He was a Roman Catholic.

Wilson died on January 14, 2018, in Charlottesville, Virginia, at the age of 74 of lung cancer and emphysema.

Filmography

Films

Television

References

External links

1943 births
2018 deaths
20th-century American male actors
20th-century American male writers
20th-century American screenwriters
21st-century American male actors
American male screenwriters
American television directors
American television producers
American male television writers
American television writers
Comedy film directors
Deaths from emphysema
Deaths from lung cancer in Virginia
Film directors from Florida
Male actors from Miami
Primetime Emmy Award winners
Screenwriters from Florida
University of Florida alumni
University of Virginia faculty
Writers from Miami